Arthur Wheeler may refer to:

 Arthur C. Wheeler (1856–1941), mayor of Norwalk, Connecticut (1895–1897)
 Arthur Oliver Wheeler (1860–1945), co-founder of the Alpine Club of Canada
 Sir Arthur Wheeler, 1st Baronet (1860–1943), English stockbroker and financier
 Arthur Wheeler (motorcyclist) (1916–2001), British Grand Prix motorcycle racer
 Art Wheeler (1872–1917), American football player